Naunihal Singh (2 January 1923 – 25 June 2009) was an Indian politician. He was a Member of Parliament, representing Uttar Pradesh in the Rajya Sabha the upper house of India's Parliament as a member of the Bharatiya Janata Party. Singh died on 25 June 2009, at the age of 86.

References

1923 births
2009 deaths
Bharatiya Janata Party politicians from Uttar Pradesh
Rajya Sabha members from Uttar Pradesh